Georgina Dufoix (born Georgina Nègre on 16 February 1942) is a French politician, who served as Minister of Social Affairs and National Solidarity from 1984 to 1986, in the government of Laurent Fabius.

References

Living people
1942 births
Government ministers of France
20th-century French politicians